Çörekli can refer to:

 Çörekli, İliç
 Çörekli, Midyat